FC Nika Moscow is a Russian association football club from Moscow, founded in 1999. It played professionally in the Russian Second Division in 2001 and from 2005 to 2010. Currently it plays in the Amateur Football League.

External links
Club info at 2liga.ru 

Association football clubs established in 1999
Defunct football clubs in Moscow
1999 establishments in Russia